This is a list of Mazda motor vehicle models. Mazda had used a number of different marques in the Japan market, including Autozam, Eunos, and Efini, although they have been phased out. In the early 1990s Mazda almost created a luxury marque, Amati, to challenge Acura, Infiniti, and Lexus in North America, but this never happened, leaving the near-luxury Millenia to the Mazda brand. Many Mazda vehicles have been rebadged and sold with the Ford brand during the alliance of both companies. Most are noted in the pages of individual vehicles.

Previous sports models of Mazda's regular vehicles go by the Mazdaspeed name. Mazdaspeed is Mazda's in-house race and street car tuning arm and is highly involved in both amateur and professional motorsports.

Current products
This is the current Mazda automobile listing internationally.

Former products
 1931–1959 Mazda-Go three-wheel truck
 1959–1969 K360 three-wheel truck
 1960–1966 R360 kei car sedan
 1961–2006 B Series pickup truck
 1964–2003 Familia compact car
 1966–1991 Luce luxury car
 1967–1996 Cosmo sports car
 1970–2002 Capella mid-size car
 1970–1973 Pathfinder XV-1 off-road truck
 1971-1991 Mazda Savanna sports car
 1972–1997 Parkway minibus
 1973–1997 929 full-size car
 1978–2002 RX-7 sports car
 1978–2003 626, export version of the Mazda Capella
 1988–1992 Persona mid-size car
 1988–2002 121 compact car
 1988–1997 MX-6 coupé
 1988–2016 MPV/Mazda8 minivan
 1990–1998 Sentia luxury car
 1990–1998 MX-3 coupé
 1990–1998 Revue subcompact car
 1991–1994 Navajo SUV
 1991–1997 Cronos, rebadged Mazda Capella
 1992–1999 Xedos 6/Eunos 500 luxury car
 1992–1997 ɛ̃fini MS-8 luxury car
 1992–1994 AZ-1 kei sports car
 1993–1997 Lantis/323F compact car
 1993–2002 Millenia luxury car
 1994–2018 Familia Wagon/Van subcompact station wagon
 1998–2014 AZ-Offroad SUV
 1999–2018 Premacy/Mazda5 small minivan
 2001–2011 Tribute SUV
 2002–2008 Spiano kei car
 2003–2012 RX-8 sports car
 2003      RX-8 Hydrogen RE bi-fuel sports car
 2004–2015 Verisa Subcompact car
 2007–2012 CX-7 crossover SUV
 2008–2018 Biante minivan
 2013–2017 VX-1 mini MPV

Concept cars

Mazda Activehicle (1999)
Mazda AZ550 (1989)
Mazda BU-X (1995)
Mazda Chantez EV (1972)
Mazda CU-X (1995)
Mazda CVS (1974)
Mazda Deep Orange 3 (2013)
Mazda EX-005 (1970)
Mazda Furai (2008)
Mazda Gissya (1991)
Mazda Hakaze Concept (2007)
Mazda Hazumi (2014)
Mazda HR-X (1991)
Mazda HR-X 2 (1993)
Mazda Ibuki (2003)
Mazda Kaan
Mazda Kabura (2006)
Mazda Kai (2017)
Mazda Kazamai (2008)
Mazda Kiyora (2008)
Mazda Koeru (2015)
Mazda Kusabi (2003)
Mazda Le Mans Prototype (1983)
Mazda LM55 Vision Gran Turismo (2014)
Mazda London Taxi (1993)
Mazda Miata Mono-Posto (1999)
Mazda Minagi (2011)
Mazda MS-X (1997)
Mazda MV-X (1997)
Mazda MX-02 (1983)
Mazda MX-03 (1985)

Mazda MX-04 (1987)
Mazda MX-5 Superlight (2009)
Mazda MX-81 (1981)
Mazda MX-Crossport (2005)
Mazda MX-Flexa (2004)
Mazda MX-Micro Sport (2004)
Mazda MX Sport Tourer (2001)
Mazda MX Sportif (2003)
Mazda Nagare (2006)
Mazda Neospace (1999)
Mazda Nextourer (1999)
Mazda Pair (1987)
Mazda RX-01 (1995)
Mazda RX 87 (1967)
Mazda RX-500 (1970)
Mazda RX-510 (1971)
Mazda RX-Evolv (1999)
Mazda RX-Vision (2015)
Mazda Ryuga (2007)
Mazda Sassou (2005)
Mazda Secret Hideout (2001)
Mazda Senku (2005)
Mazda Shinari (2010)
Mazda SU-V (1995)
Mazda SW-X (1999)
Mazda Taiki (2007)
Mazda Takeri (2011)
Mazda TD-R (1989)
Mazda Vision Coupe (2017)
Mazda Washu (2003)

Other Mazda marques

Amati (cancelled) 

 Amati 300 (Eunos 500)
 Amati 500 (Mazda Millenia)
 Amati 1000 (Mazda Sentia)

Autozam
 1990–1994 Autozam Carol keicar (Suzuki Alto)
 1990–1994 Autozam Revue subcompact car (Mazda 121)
 1990–1994 Autozam Scrum microvan (Suzuki Carry)
 1991–1994 Autozam AZ-3 coupe (Mazda MX-3)
 1992–1993 Autozam Clef sedan (Mazda Capella)
 1992–1994 Autozam AZ-1 mid-engine sports car

ɛ̃fini
 1990–1997 ɛ̃fini MPV (Mazda MPV)
 1991–1993 ɛ̃fini MS-6 (Mazda Cronos)
 1992–1997 ɛ̃fini MS-8
 1991–1993 ɛ̃fini MS-9 (Mazda 929)
 1991–1996 ɛ̃fini RX-7 (Mazda RX-7)

Eunos
 1989 Eunos 100 (Mazda Familia BG platform)
 1989 Eunos 300 (Mazda Persona MA platform)
 1992–1993 Eunos 500 (Mazda Xedos 6 CA platform)
 1993–1996 Eunos 800 (Mazda Millenia TA platform)
 1990 Eunos Cargo (SS platform)
 1990–1991 Eunos Cosmo (Mazda Cosmo JC platform)
 1991–1993 Eunos Presso/Eunos 30X (Mazda MX-3 EC platform)
 1989–1996 Eunos Roadster (Mazda MX-5 NA platform)

Xedos 
 1993–1999 Xedos 6 (Eunos 500)
 1993–2002 Xedos 9 (Mazda Millenia)

See also 
 List of Mazda platforms
 List of Mazda engines
 Mazda

Mazda